The United States expedition to Korea, known in Korea as the Shinmiyangyo or simply the Korean Expedition, was an American military action in Korea and took place predominantly on and around Ganghwa Island in 1871. 

The reason for the presence of the American land and naval force in Korea was to support an American diplomatic delegation sent to negotiate trade and political relations with the peninsular nation led by the American ambassador to China, Frederick Low, to ascertain the fate of the merchant ship General Sherman, which had gone missing while visiting Korea in 1866. However, according to a National Interest article, Low's own records indicated the punitive campaign was motivated by a need to demonstrate American power over what he considered to be a weaker nation. Previously, the American commanders had felt entitled to be able to "peacefully" enter Korean waters for survey and trade using heavily armed warships and had ignored repeated diplomatic requests to respect Korean sovereignty.

In 1871, the United States sent Low along with the U.S. Navy's Asiatic Squadron to Korea to both investigate the General Sherman's disappearance and also attempt to convince the Koreans to open up trade relations. The Korean officials however made it clear to Low that they were not interested in a trade treaty. When Korean shore batteries attacked two American warships on 1 June on the Han River, Low decided to attack the forts unless the Koreans had formally apologized for the riverside ambush. However Korean officials sent letters holding the Americans as responsible for breaking their country's laws through unlawfully sending armed warships into their territorial waters, and also finally explaining to Low what had similarly happened to the General Sherman. The governor of Ganghwa also sent what Low described as a "few worthless articles"—three cows, fifty chickens, and a thousand eggs—in an effort to de-escalate things. The Americans rejected the offer. Instead, a punitive campaign was launched after the commanding American admiral failed to receive an official apology from the Koreans that they felt they were owed. The isolationist nature of the Joseon dynasty government and the imperial nature of the Americans to not recognize Korea's set policies, changed a diplomatic expedition into an armed conflict. 

On 10 June, about 650 Americans landed and captured several forts culminating in the Battle of Ganghwa, at which over 200 Korean troops were killed with a loss of only three American soldiers. Low had expected the Koreans to concede after this victory, but he was instead told that there would be no negotiations and no further meetings with Korean diplomats. After failing to leverage their hostages and receiving news of larger and better equipped Korean reinforcements, Low realized they had insufficient forces to achieve their goals and chose to withdraw. A trade treaty between the two countries would not be made until 1882, six years after the Japan–Korea Treaty of 1876 forcefully ended Korea's isolationism.

Initial contact
Embarked aboard Colorado was Rear Admiral John Rodgers, and Frederick F. Low, the United States Ambassador to China. The Korean forces, known as "Tiger Hunters", were led by General Eo Jae-yeon (Hangul; 어재연 Hanja; 魚在淵).

The Americans safely made contact with the Korean inhabitants, described as "people wearing white clothes". When they inquired about the General Sherman incident, the Koreans were initially reluctant to discuss the topic, ostensibly to avoid having to pay any recompense. The Americans consequently let the Koreans know that their fleet would be exploring the area and that they meant no harm. This gesture was misinterpreted; Korean policy at the time prohibited foreign ships from sailing on the Han River, as it led directly to the capital city of Hanyang, modern-day Seoul. Therefore, the Joseon government rejected the U.S. request. However, despite the Joseon government's refusal, the United States sailed.

On 1 June, the Korean fortress fired at the U.S. fleet as they sailed up the Ganghwa Straits, which leads to the river. The U.S. forces were not badly damaged due to "the bad gunnery of the [K]oreans, whose fire, although very hot for the fifteen minutes in which they maintained it, was ill-directed, and consequently without effect." The U.S. demanded an apology within 10 days; there was no response so Rodgers decided on a punitive assault on the forts.

Battle of Ganghwa

On 10 June, the Americans attacked the lightly defended Choji Garrison on Ganghwa, along the Salee River. The Koreans were armed with severely outdated weapons, such as matchlock muskets and outdated cannons. After being quickly overrun, the Americans moved on to their next objective, the Deokjin Garrison. The poorly armed Korean forces were kept from effective range by American 12-pound howitzers. The American troops continued towards the next objective, Deokjin Fort, which they found abandoned. The sailors and Marines quickly dismantled this fortress and continued to Gwangseong Garrison, a citadel. By this time, Korean forces had regrouped there. Along the way, some Korean units tried to flank the U.S. forces but were beaten off again due to the strategic placement of artillery on two hills.

Artillery fire from ground forces and Monocacy offshore pounded the citadel in preparation for an assault by U.S. forces. A force of 546 sailors and 105 Marines grouped on the hills west of the fortress (infantry troops were on the hill directly west of the fortress, while artillery troops on another hill both shelled the fortress and also covered the Americans' flanks and rear), keeping cover and returning fire. Once the bombardment stopped, the Americans charged the citadel, led by Lieutenant Hugh McKee. The slow reload time of the Korean matchlocks aided the Americans, armed with superior Remington rolling block carbines, in making it over the walls; the Koreans even ended up throwing rocks at the attackers.

McKee was the first to make it into the citadel and was fatally wounded by a shot to the groin; after him came commander Winfield Scott Schley, who shot the Korean soldier who had killed McKee. The flag of the Korean commander, General Eo Jae-yŏn, called the "Sujagi" by Koreans, was captured by Corporal Charles Brown of Colorados guard and Private Hugh Purvis of Alaskas guard. General Eo was killed by Private James Dougherty. While serving as the color bearer for Colorados crew and Marines, Colorado Carpenter Cyrus Hayden planted the U.S. flag on the ramparts under heavy enemy fire. Corporal Brown, Privates Dougherty, Purvis, and Carpenter Hayden received the Medal of Honor.

The fighting lasted fifteen minutes. The total number killed was 243 Koreans and three Americans; McKee, Seaman Seth Allen, and U.S. Marine Corps Private Denis Hanrahan. ten Americans were wounded, and 20 Koreans were captured, several of whom were wounded. Five Korean forts were taken in total, with dozens of various small cannons. The Korean deputy commander was among the wounded who were captured. The U.S. hoped to use the captives as a bargaining chip to meet with local officials, but the Koreans refused, calling the captives cowards and "Low was told that he was welcome to keep the wounded prisoners." However, the Americans released the prisoners before departing.

Following the military operations of 10–12 June, the United States Asiatic Squadron stayed at anchorage off Jakyak Island until 3 July, when they left for China.

Aftermath
The United States had hoped that their victory would persuade the Koreans to return to the negotiating table. But the Koreans refused to negotiate. In fact, these events led the regent Daewon-gun to strengthen his policy of isolation and issue a national proclamation against appeasing foreigners. Additionally the Koreans soon sent reinforcements in large numbers that were armed with more modern weapons to confront the American troops. Realizing that the odds had shifted, the U.S. fleet consequently departed and set sail for China on 3 July.

There were no further attacks on foreign ships. In 1876, Korea established a trade treaty with Japan after Japanese ships approached Ganghwa Island and threatened to fire on Seoul. Treaties with European countries and the U.S. soon followed.

Nine sailors (Chief Quartermaster Grace, Quartermasters Troy, Franklin and Rogers, Boatswain's Mate McKenzie, Ordinary Seaman Andrews, Carpenter Hayden, and Landsmen Lukes and Merton) and six Marines (Corporal Brown and Privates Coleman, Dougherty, McNamara, Owens, and Purvis) were awarded the Medal of Honor, the first for actions in a foreign conflict.

Treaty of Amity and Commerce

From April–May 1882, the United States, represented by Commodore Robert W. Shufeldt of the United States Navy, and Korea negotiated and approved a 14-article treaty. The treaty established mutual friendship and mutual assistance in case of attack; and also addressed such specific matters as extraterritorial rights for American citizens in Korea and most favored nation trade status.

The treaty remained in effect until the annexation of Korea in 1910.

Gallery

See also
Black Ships
French expedition to Korea
Ganghwa Island incident
History of Korea
List of Medal of Honor recipients - Korean Expedition
Military history of Korea
Mr. Sunshine (2018 TV series)

Notes

References

Gordon H. Chang, "Whose 'Barbarism'? Whose 'Treachery'? Race and Civilization in the Unknown United States-Korea War of 1871," Journal of American History, Vol. 89, No. 4 (March 2003), pp. 1331–1365 in JSTOR
Yŏng-ho Ch'oe; William Theodore De Bary; Martina Deuchler and Peter Hacksoo Lee. (2000). Sources of Korean Tradition: From the Sixteenth to the Twentieth Centuries. New York: Columbia University Press. ; ; OCLC 248562016

External links

medal of Honor Link {1871} reference only
1871 US Korea Campaign
The early US-Korea relations - Excerpt from "A Brief History of the US-Korea Relations Prior to 1945"

Marine Amphibious Landing in Korea, 1871

1871 in Korea
Conflicts in 1871
Joseon dynasty
Korea–United States relations
Military history of Korea
Presidency of Ulysses S. Grant
Korea
United States Marine Corps in the 18th and 19th centuries
Wars involving Joseon
Korea
June 1871 events
July 1871 events
19th-century military history of the United States